The 1964 Munster Senior Club Hurling Championship was the inaugural staging of the Munster Senior Club Hurling Championship since its establishment by the Munster Council. The championship, which was open to the champion clubs of 1964, began on 7 March 1965 and ended on 10 April 1966.

On 10 April 1966, Glen Rovers won the championship after a 3-07 to 1-07 defeat of Mount Sion in the final at the Gaelic Grounds. It was their first ever championship title.

Jimmy Doyle from the Thurles Sarsfields club was the championship's top scorer with 5-08.

Results

First round

Semi-finals

Finals

Championship statistics

Top scorers

Top scorer overall

Top scorers in a single game

References

1964 in hurling
Munster Senior Club Hurling Championship